Eudonia gressitti is a moth in the family Crambidae. It was described by Eugene G. Munroe in 1964. This species is endemic to New Zealand, where it has been recorded from the Campbell Islands.

References

Moths described in 1964
Eudonia
Moths of New Zealand
Endemic fauna of New Zealand
Endemic moths of New Zealand